Chrysops caecutiens, common name splayed deer fly,  is a species of horse fly belonging to the family Tabanidae. It is also known by the colloquial name Scotch Cleg.

Description
The mesonotum and the scutellum are glossy black with yellow-brown hairs. The compound eyes have red and green reflections, with dark spots. The transparent wings have dark brown patches, located at the top and at the centre of each wing. The abdomen shows distinct black inverted-V marking (hence the common name of "splayed" deer fly). The legs are black, included the tibiae on the middle pair of legs. They are active from May to September.

Biology
The larvae of the splayed deer fly feed upon algae and organic matter in damp muddy soils.
The adult female flies feed on mammalian blood (including on roe deer), in order for their eggs to mature properly. When they bite, they inject saliva with an anti-coagulating agent that prevent the blood clotting. The structure of the ommatidia in the midregion of the eyes of the females may use high polarization to assist in host-finding. Adult males and females feed also on nectar and pollen of flowers (mainly Leucanthemum vulgare).

Distribution
This species is present in most of Europe, the eastern Palearctic realm, and the Near East.

Habitat
These horseflies preferably live in shaded marshlands and in damp woodlands.

References

Diptera of Europe
Tabanidae
Flies described in 1758
Articles containing video clips
Taxa named by Carl Linnaeus